Adam Janowski (born 19 September 1987, in London) is a professional rugby league footballer for Harlequins RL in the Super League. He made his début against Leeds Rhinos in Round 17 of the 2008 Super League season.

Janowski started out as a junior at the South London Storm. Whilst at Storm he represented England U15s against the Welsh.

References

External links

1987 births
Living people
English people of Polish descent
English rugby league players
London Broncos players
Rugby league players from London
Rugby league props